William B. Hurlbutt is a Consulting Professor in the Department of Neurobiology at Stanford University Medical Center.  Born in 1945 in St. Helena, California, he grew up in Bronxville, New York.

After receiving his undergraduate (1968) and medical (1974) training at Stanford University, he completed postdoctoral studies in theology and medical ethics. He studied with Robert Hamerton-Kelly, the dean of the chapel at Stanford, and subsequently with the Rev. Louis Bouyer of the Institut Catholique de Paris. In addition to teaching at Stanford, Hurlbut served for eight years on the President's Council on Bioethics from 2001 to 2009, and is currently a senior fellow at the Trinity Forum.

Career
His primary areas of interest involve the ethical issues associated with advancing biomedical technology, the biological basis of moral awareness, and studies in the integration of theology and philosophy of biology.  His courses in biomedical ethics in the Program in Human Biology have included: Biology, Technology and Human Life, and Social and Ethical Issues in the Neurosciences. He has worked with NASA on projects in astrobiology. Since 1998 Hurlbut has been a member of the Chemical and Biological Warfare working group at the Stanford University Center for International Security and Cooperation. He is also a senior fellow at The Trinity Forum.

Hurlbut is noted for his advocacy of Altered Nuclear Transfer (ANT), a scientific method of obtaining pluripotent stem cells without the creation and destruction of human embryos, and has spoken on the intrinsic dignity of human life, including the moral value of the human embryo.

He attended the Beyond Belief symposium in November 2006. In mid-2007, Hurlbut was the guest of the BBC World Service Radio programme, The Interview.

In 2009, commentary from Hurlbut was featured in the futurist documentary, Transcendent Man. In 2010, Hurlbut was featured in the award-winning documentary film, The Human Experience.

External links
Stanford Bio
U.S. President's Council on Bioethics
Home page of the Center for International Security and Cooperation
One Small Island of Unity in a Sea of Controversy Q&A on altered nuclear transfer with The National Review
On the Dangers of Radical Lifespan Extension interview with USNews
Explanation of the theory of Altered Nuclear Transfer
 
 Interview concerning ethical use of human embryos

Year of birth missing (living people)
21st-century American biologists
Stanford University School of Medicine faculty
People from Bronxville, New York
Stanford University alumni
Living people
People from St. Helena, California
Scientists from New York (state)